Gilford Island/Echo Bay Water Aerodrome  is located adjacent to Gilford Island, British Columbia, Canada.

See also
Gilford Island/Health Bay Water Aerodrome

References

Seaplane bases in British Columbia
Regional District of Mount Waddington
Registered aerodromes in British Columbia